USS Nimitz (CVN-68) is an aircraft carrier of the United States Navy, and the lead ship of her class. One of the largest warships in the world, she was laid down, launched, and commissioned as CVAN-68, "aircraft carrier, attack, nuclear powered", but she was later redesignated as CVN-68, "aircraft carrier, multi-mission, nuclear-powered", on 30 June 1975, as part of a fleet-wide realignment that year.

The ship was named after World War II Pacific fleet commander Chester W. Nimitz, USN, (1885–1966), who was the Navy's third fleet admiral. Nimitz had her homeport at Naval Station Norfolk until 1987, when she was relocated to Naval Station Bremerton in Washington (now part of Naval Base Kitsap). Following her Refueling and Complex Overhaul in 2001, her home port was changed to Naval Air Station North Island in San Diego County, California. The home port of Nimitz was again moved to Naval Station Everett in Washington in 2012.

In January 2015, Nimitz changed home port from Everett back to Naval Base Kitsap.

Construction

Nimitz was authorized by the U.S. Congress in fiscal year 1967 and Newport News Shipbuilding and Dry Dock Co. in Newport News, Virginia, was awarded the $106.5 million contract (equivalent to $ million today). The keel was laid down on 22 June 1968. The vessel was christened on 13 May 1972 by Catherine Nimitz Lay, the daughter of the late Admiral Nimitz, six years after his death. Nimitz was delivered to the Navy in 1975, and was commissioned at Naval Station Norfolk on 3 May 1975 by the 38th President of the United States, Gerald R. Ford.

Nimitz Carrier Strike Group
Nimitz is part of Carrier Strike Group Eleven (CSG-11) with Carrier Air Wing Seventeen (CVW-17) embarked, with Nimitz as the flagship of the strike group and the home of the commander of Destroyer Squadron 9.

Ships of Destroyer Squadron 23
  – 
  – Arleigh Burke-class destroyer
  – Arleigh Burke-class destroyer
  – Arleigh Burke-class destroyer
  – Arleigh Burke-class destroyer

Squadrons of CVW-17

 Strike Fighter Squadron 22 (VFA-22) "Fighting Redcocks" with Boeing F/A-18F Super Hornets
 Strike Fighter Squadron 94 (VFA-94) "Mighty Shrikes" with F/A-18F Super Hornets
 Strike Fighter Squadron 137 (VFA-137) "Kestrels" with F/A-18E Super Hornets
 Strike Fighter Squadron 146 (VFA-146) "Blue Diamonds" with F/A-18E Super Hornets
 Electronic Attack Squadron 139 (VAQ-139) "Cougars" with Boeing EA-18G Growlers
 Carrier Airborne Early Warning Squadron 116 (VAW-116) "Sun Kings" with Northrop Grumman E-2C Hawkeyes
 Helicopter Sea Combat Squadron 6 (HSC-6) "Screaming Indians" with Sikorsky MH-60S Seahawks
 Helicopter Maritime Strike Squadron 73 (HSM-73) "Battle Cats" with MH-60R Seahawks
 Fleet Logistics Support Squadron 30 Detachment 1 (VRC-30) "Providers" with Grumman C-2 Greyhound

Service history

1970s

In November 1976, Nimitz was awarded the Battle "E" from Commander, Naval Air Force U.S. Atlantic Fleet, for being the most efficient and foremost aircraft carrier in the Atlantic Fleet. The cruise was uneventful, and the carrier returned to Norfolk, Virginia on 7 February 1977.

A second uneventful Mediterranean cruise was conducted from 1 December 1977 to 20 July 1978. The third deployment began on 10 September 1979 to the Mediterranean. The ship moved to the Indian Ocean in response to the Iran hostage crisis in which the U.S. Embassy in Tehran, Iran, was overtaken and 52 hostages were held. Prior to this trip, the ship took part in the shooting of the 1980 film The Final Countdown, whose story was specifically set aboard the Nimitz. After four months on station, Operation Evening Light was launched from Nimitzs decks in an attempt to rescue the U.S. Embassy staff. The mission was aborted after a helicopter crashed at a refueling point in the Iranian desert. The ship returned home 26 May 1980, having spent 144 days at sea.

1980s
On 26 May 1981, a Marine Corps EA-6B Prowler assigned to Carrier Air Wing 8 (CVW-8) crashed on the flight deck, killing 14 crewmen and injuring 45 others. The Prowler was fuel-critical after a "bolter" (missed approach), and its crash and the subsequent fire and explosions destroyed or damaged nineteen other aircraft.
Despite having no connection to the accident, the media focused on the autopsy results of several members of the Nimitzs enlisted flight deck crew who were killed, who tested positive for marijuana. In an article by Robert Reinhold in the 17 June 1981 edition of The New York Times, it was reported that "Experts at the National Institute on Drug Abuse say that it would probably be impossible to establish conclusively that any of the Nimitz crew had been smoking marijuana on the night of the crash because the test does not directly detect the component of marijuana smoke that acts on the brain. Because the metabolites may persist in the blood for many days, the test may detect marijuana that was used many days earlier long after the effects have worn off".  As a result, President Ronald Reagan instituted a "Zero Tolerance" drug policy across all of the U.S. armed services, which started the mandatory drug testing of all U.S. military personnel.

Nimitz deployed again to the Mediterranean on 3 August 1981. On the morning of 19 August 1981, two Grumman F-14 Tomcats of VF-41 were engaged by two Libyan Su-22's, resulting in the two Libyan aircraft being shot down in what became known as the Gulf of Sidra incident.

Nimitzs fourth deployment, from 10 November 1982 to 20 May 1983, was to the Caribbean Sea and the Mediterranean Sea. Nimitz deployed for a fifth time on 8 March 1985. On 14 June 1985, two Lebanese gunmen hijacked TWA Flight 847, which carried 153 passengers and crew and included Americans. In response, Nimitz was deployed to the coast of Lebanon, where the ship remained until August 1985. The embarked Airwing 8 flew continuous sorties for 67 days, bombing several sites in Beirut including the runways of Beirut Rafic Hariri International Airport. The ship returned to Norfolk on 4 October 1985.

Nimitz, again with CVW-8 embarked, departed Norfolk for the sixth and final Mediterranean deployment on 30 December 1986. After four months and numerous Mediterranean port visits, the carrier crossed the equator en route to Rio de Janeiro. From Rio de Janeiro, she proceeded south around Cape Horn and into the Pacific Ocean. After a brief stop in San Diego, to offload the East Coast air wing, Nimitz arrived at her new home port of Bremerton, Washington, on 2 July 1987.

Nimitz deployed to the Western Pacific with Carrier Air Wing 9 embarked on 2 September 1988. During the 1988 Olympic Games in Seoul, Nimitz provided security off the coast of South Korea, then in October, operated in the North Arabian Sea participating in Operation Earnest Will, the protection of reflagged Kuwaiti tankers. On 30 November 1988, while in the Arabian Sea, a 20 mm cannon accidentally fired during maintenance, striking a KA-6 Intruder. The ensuing fire spread to six other aircraft, and two sailors were killed. Nimitz returned to Bremerton on 2 March 1989.

1990s
Nimitz again deployed to the Persian Gulf on 1 February 1993, in support of Operation Southern Watch, returning on 1 August 1993.

On 27 November 1995, Nimitz deployed to the Western Pacific, Indian Ocean and Persian Gulf with Carrier Air Wing Nine (CVW-9). In March 1996, the ship patrolled the waters off Taiwan amid missile tests conducted by the Chinese in the area, becoming the first American warship to pass through the Taiwan Strait since 1976. Nimitz also cruised the Persian Gulf in support of Southern Watch prior to returning from deployment on 20 May 1996.

Between 14 and 24 July 1997, Nimitz participated in Joint Task Force Exercise 97-2 (JTFEX 97–2) off the coast of southern California, which also served as a "Revolution in Strike Warfare" demonstration. The latter event was designed to demonstrate the capability of an aircraft carrier and an embarked air wing to project carrier-based airpower into littoral warfare. On 20 July 1997, Nimitz and Carrier Air Wing Nine began a high-intensity strike campaign. When flight operations were completed four days later, Nimitz and Carrier Air Wing Nine had carried out 771 strike sorties while dropping 1,337 bombs on target. Carrier Air Wing Nine flew 975 fixed-wing sorties during this four-day surge operation. Almost 80 percent of the sorties flown were strike sorties, with strike support accounting for another 10 percent. F/A-18 Hornet strike fighters flew nearly 80 percent of the strike sorties. Of the 771 strike sorties, 727 were loaded with ordnance, while 44 were electronic support by EA-6B Prowlers. During this four-day period, only a portion of the medium-range interdiction strikes required tanking support. KC-135 and KC-130 tanker aircraft provided most of this support. S-3 Vikings conducted recovery tanking and supplied more than one-third of the fuel passed to Carrier Air Wing Nine aircraft during this surge operation. This surge had been preceded by a 16-hour preparation after undergoing four days that had generated about 700 fixed-winged sorties. A following study by the Center for Naval Analyses determined that Nimitz and Carrier Air Wing Nine could have maintained this high-sortie operational tempo for another twelve to twenty-four hours before requiring equipment maintenance, rest for the crews while ordnance and aviation fuel stocks to be replenished.

On 1 September 1997, Nimitz began an around the world cruise, again supporting Southern Watch, which ended in Newport News, Virginia on 2 March 1998. She next spent the next three years undergoing a nuclear Refueling and Complex Overhaul that ended on 25 June 2001.

2000s

On 21 September 2001, after sea trials in the Virginia Capes, Nimitz began to transit around South America to the new home port of NAS North Island in San Diego, California, arriving there on 13 November 2001. Aircraft from Carrier Air Reserve Wing 20 were embarked for the transit. From January to May 2002, a four-month post-shakedown maintenance availability was completed at North Island; during this time Advanced combat direction system was installed.

Nimitzs eleventh operational deployment began on 3 March 2003. The group relieved  in the Persian Gulf in mid-April 2003, launching Carrier Air Wing 11 aircraft sorties over Iraq in support of Operation Iraqi Freedom (OIF) and Afghanistan in support of Operation Enduring Freedom (OEF). She returned to San Diego on 5 November 2003. Nimitz and CVW-11 were awarded the 2003 Battle "E" and Flatley Award in early 2004.

Princeton subsequently contacted two Navy F/A-18F fighters from Nimitz whose cockpit instrumentation recorded data and imagery that some pilots interpreted as an object accelerating and maneuvering at extraordinary speeds. The incident was publicized in December 2017 along with details of the Advanced Aviation Threat Identification Program.

Nimitz, again with CVW-11 embarked, deployed to the Persian Gulf on 7 May 2005, returning on 8 November 2005. This deployment marked three decades of service, and was depicted in the Emmy award-winning 2008 PBS documentary series Carrier. In June 2006, Nimitz was awarded the 2005 Battle "E".

The carrier departed North Island for her thirteenth deployment on 2 April 2007 to the Arabian Sea, relieving  in support of OIF. The carrier anchored off Chennai, India on 2 July 2007 as part of efforts to expand bilateral defense cooperation between India and the United States. Sailors participated in community work in Chennai prior to departing, on 5 July 2007, along with the destroyer  towards the Persian Gulf, and then returned to North Island on 30 September 2007.

On 24 January 2008, Nimitz deployed to the Pacific for a "surge"-deployment. On 9 February 2008, two Russian Tu-95 'Bear' bombers overflew the carrier in the Western Pacific. Reportedly, there was no radio communication between the American and Russian aircraft. On the same day, Russian aircraft entered Japanese airspace, which caused the Japanese to raise protest to the Russian ambassador in Tokyo.

Two F/A-18 fighters intercepted the Russian aircraft and escorted it out of the area.

Nimitz was awarded the Navy Battle "E" for battle efficiency for 2007 along with the Ney award for food service excellence, and returned to her home port of San Diego on 3 June 2008.

The Nimitz Strike Group, including CVW-11, departed the States for a scheduled Western Pacific deployment on 31 July 2009, and began to fly combat missions in support of Operation Enduring Freedom 21 September.

2010s

In January 2010, while in the Persian Gulf, the ship was awarded the Meritorious Unit Commendation for back-to-back deployments in support of the wars in Iraq and Afghanistan in 2007 and 2008. The award was presented by Admiral Gary Roughead in a ceremony on the ship on 6 January 2010.

Nimitz visited Hong Kong for five days in February 2010 to allow the crew to rest and visit the city. The visit occurred despite China previously preventing a visit by the carrier .

On 9 December 2010, the Navy formally announced that Everett, Washington was to be the new home port for Nimitz. This move was expected to save the Navy $100 million. On 9 March 2012, Nimitz arrived at her new homeport of Naval Station Everett after spending nearly a week at sea conducting post overhaul sea trials.

In March 2012, Nimitz arrived at the new home port of Naval Station Everett in Washington state after more than a year of maintenance work in Bremerton, replacing sister carrier, Abraham Lincoln. On 3 August 2012, Nimitz departed from Pearl Harbor after a two-day port call, arriving at NAS North Island on 9 August 2012 to begin Fleet Replacement Squadron carrier qualifications. On 6 October 2012, a Bell Boeing V-22 Osprey tilt-rotor aircraft from squadron VMM-165 landed and refuelled on board Nimitz. This operation was part of an evaluation of the feasibility of the MV-22 as a potential replacement for the C-2 Greyhound carrier onboard delivery (COD) cargo transport aircraft.

The BBC reported that Nimitz was located in the Persian Gulf, ready to contribute to an operation against Syria when President Obama ordered a military strike. Two days later it was reported that the carrier task group had been re-routed westwards across the Arabian Sea.

It was reported that Nimitz, after eight months at sea, transited the Suez Canal on 20 October 2013 into the U.S. 6th Fleet area of responsibility, where the Navy intended to keep her for a few weeks conducting joint training with allied nations before returning home. Nimitz returned to Everett on 16 December 2013.

In late 2014, following the completion of work up qualifications, Nimitz participated in her first deployment, a two-week multi-national fleet exercise involving the Third Fleet, as well as ships from the Royal Canadian Navy and JMSDF. Following the conclusion of the exercise, on 3 November the first F-35C Lightning II to land on an aircraft carrier recovered aboard Nimitz to begin a two-week Development Testing I deployment. This saw a pair of aircraft from VX-23 undertaking carrier operations of launch, recovery and handling aboard ship in both day and night conditions. The initial deployment was completed on 14 November 2014. In 2015, Nimitz transferred to Bremerton to undergo a 16-month maintenance cycle.

On 1 June 2017, Nimitz left Naval Base Kitsap for her next scheduled deployment. This deployment was against ISIS in Iraq and Syria. Her F/A-18s played an important role in the Battle of Tal Afar, providing precision air support for advancing Iraqi soldiers.

On 1 March 2018, Nimitz entered dry dock at Puget Sound Naval Shipyard for ten months of overhaul.

2020s

COVID-19 pandemic

In April 2020, the coronavirus was reported to have spread to Nimitz when the first case was reported on 7 April. One sailor had received a positive result the previous week after exhibiting symptoms, and was subsequently placed in isolation and removed from the ship. Another crew member also tested positive, but was reported to have not been working on the ship. On 27 April, Nimitz completed a 27-day quarantine and began COMPTUEX training.

On 31 December 2020, acting Secretary of Defense Chris Miller ordered Nimitz to return directly to her home port following a nearly ten-month deployment in the Fifth Fleet area of operation.

On 3 January 2021, in an abrupt reversal, acting Defense Secretary Miller ordered Nimitz to redeploy due to "Recent threats issued by Iranian leaders against President Trump and other U.S. government officials."

In May 2022, Nimitz led Carrier Strike Group 11 in the Eastern Pacific Ocean.

Planned retirement
The Nimitz-class carriers have a lifespan of approximately 50 years. Estimates on decommissioning for Nimitz herself were updated in April 2022, with the Navy Press Corps indicating that, “USS Nimitz (CVN 68) is planned to be removed from the battle force in fiscal year (FY) 2025, when the ship's Terminal Off-load Program begins, with inactivation scheduled to begin in 2027.”

Overhauls
 October 1975 to December 1975 – Post Shakedown Availability
 May 1977 to July 1977 – Selected Restricted Availability
 October 1978 to January 1979 – Selected Restricted Availability
 October 1980 to January 1981 – Selected Restricted Availability
 April 1982 to June 1982 – Selected Restricted Availability – waist catapult bridle catcher removed.
 June 1983 to July 1984 – Complex Overhaul – forward port sponson added; 3 Mk-25 BPDMs replaced with 2 Mk-29; 3 CIWS added; SPS-49 search radar replaces SPS-43.
 November 1985 to March 1986 – Selected Restricted Availability – forward port sponson changed/enlarged.
 August 1987 to February 1988 – Selected Restricted Availability
 August 1989 to March 1990 – Selected Restricted Availability
 October 1991 to May 1992 – Selected Restricted Availability
 December 1993 to January 1995 – Selected Restricted Availability – port bow catapult bridle catcher removed.
 June 1996 to January 1997 – Selected Restricted Availability
 May 1998 to June 2001 – Refueling and Complex Overhaul – starboard bow catapult bridle catcher removed; top two levels of the island replaced; new antenna mast; new radar tower; RAM replaced CIWS at forward port sponson; RAM added to aft starboard sponson; 2 CIWS at island/stern removed.
 February 2004 to August 2004 – Planned Incremental Availability – catwalk grating was replaced and flight deck resurfaced.
 March 2006 to September 2006 – Planned Incremental Availability
 July 2008 to January 2009 – Planned Incremental Availability
 November 2010 to March 2012 – Planned Incremental Availability – 2 CIWS added to forward starboard sponson enlargement/new port stern sponson.
 January 2015 to October 2016 – Planned Incremental Availability
 March 2018 to (approximately) May 2019 – Planned Incremental Availability

Awards and decorations

In popular culture

The Final Countdown, a 1980 alternate history science fiction film about a modern aircraft carrier that travels through time to the day before the 1941 attack on Pearl Harbor, was set and filmed on board the real-life USS Nimitz.

The PBS series Carrier followed the May–November 2005 deployment of Nimitz to the Persian Gulf, documenting the life and shipboard routines of the crew over 10 episodes.

See also
 Carrier Strike Group Eleven
 List of aircraft carriers
 List of aircraft carriers of the United States Navy
 USS Nimitz UFO incident

References

Further reading

External links 

Official
 
 USS Nimitz  – Official website
 HSC-6 – Official website
 Story archive – U.S. Navy – USS Nimitz (CVN-68)
Additional
 USS Nimitz Association
 "USS Nimitz Dry Dock – Episode 1" (or: "USS Nimitz… a documentary – Episode 1")
 "USS Nimitz Dry Dock – Episode 2"
 "USS Nimitz Dry Dock – Episode 3"
 "USS Nimitz Dry Dock – Episode 4, 'Many Hands'"
 "USS Nimitz Dry Dock – Episode 5"
 "USS Nimitz Dry Dock – Episode 6, 'The Climb'"
 "USS Nimitz Dry Dock – Episode 7, 'Heavy Work'"
 "USS Nimitz Dry Dock – Episode 8, 'Readiness'"

Images
 USS Nimitz information and images
 Maritimequest USS Nimitz CVN 68 Photo Gallery

Nimitz-class aircraft carriers
Ships built in Newport News, Virginia
1972 ships
Nuclear ships of the United States Navy
Cold War aircraft carriers of the United States
Aircraft carriers of the United States
Naval ships involved in the COVID-19 pandemic
Articles containing video clips